"Don't Treat Me Bad" is the second single by the American rock band FireHouse from its self-titled album.

Background
"Don't Treat Me Bad" was first recorded in 1990 and commercially released the following year. It reached No. 19 on the Billboard Hot 100 singles chart, becoming the band's first charting single and its first top 40 hit on the Hot 100.

Charts

References

1990 singles
1990 songs
Epic Records singles
FireHouse (band) songs
Songs written by Bill Leverty
Songs written by C. J. Snare